Roberto Raschi (born 11 August 1964) was Captain Regent of San Marino.

He was in office with Giuseppe Arzilli during the six-months term from 1 October 2004 to 1 April 2005.

He is a member of the San Marinese Socialist Party.

References

1964 births
Living people
Captains Regent of San Marino
Members of the Grand and General Council
Recipients of the Order of the Star of Romania
Sammarinese Socialist Party politicians